Bemani is  Konami's music video game division. 

It may also refer to:

Bemani, Iran, a village in Bemani Rural District, Byaban District, Minab County, Hormozgan Province, Iran
Bemani Rural District, a rural district (dehestan) in the Central of Sirik County, Hormozgan Province, Iran
Bemāni, Persian title for To Stay Alive, a 2002 Iranian drama film directed by Dariush Mehrjui
Mahdi Bemani Naeini (born 1968), Iranian film director, cinematographer, TV news producer and photographer

See also
Bemani Pocket, a short-lived attempt by Konami to capitalize on the market of portable entertainment in the late 1990s